The 1953 Summer International University Sports Week were organised by the International University Sports Federation (FISU) and held in Dortmund, West Germany, between 7 and 14 August.

Sports
  Athletics
  Basketball
  Fencing
  Football
  Swimming
  Tennis
  Water polo

References

 
1953
S
S
Summer International University Sports Week
Summer International University Sports Week, 1953
Summer International University Sports Week